The Office National d'Etudes et de Recherches Aérospatiales (ONERA) is the French national aerospace research centre. It is a public establishment with industrial and commercial operations, and carries out application-oriented research to support enhanced innovation and competitiveness in the aerospace and defense sectors.

ONERA was created in 1946 as "Office National d’Études et de Recherches Aéronautiques". Since 1963, its official name has been "Office National d’Études et de Recherches Aérospatiales". However, in January 2007, ONERA has been dubbed "The French Aerospace Lab" to improve its international visibility.

History 

ONERA's historic roots are in the Paris suburb of Meudon, south of Paris. As early as 1877, the Chalais-Meudon site hosted an aeronautical research center for military aerostats (balloons): Etablissement central de l’aérostation militaire.

ONERA was created in May 1946 to relaunch aeronautics research, an activity that had gone into hibernation during the Second World War and the German occupation. Its creation reflected the government's decision to recover the large wind tunnel in Ötztal, Austria, in the French administrative zone, and move it to France. Today, ONERA's extensive array of wind tunnels is one of its main assets. ONERA operates a world-class fleet of wind tunnels, the largest in Europe. The S1MA wind tunnel at Modane-Avrieux, developing 88 MW of total power, is Europe's largest transonic wind tunnel (tests at Mach 0.05 to Mach 1).

Organization 

The Chairman and CEO of ONERA is appointed by the French Council of Ministers, acting on a proposal by the Minister of Defense. Since June 2014, the Chairman and CEO is Bruno Sainjon.

ONERA is organized in eight geographic areas. It has about 2,000 employees, with 1,500 engineers and scientists (including 230 doctoral candidates), as well as support staff.

Three centers in the greater Paris area (Ile-de-France):
 Palaiseau, current headquarters
 Châtillon 
 Meudon
Two centers in the Midi-Pyrenees region of southwest France: 
 Toulouse, near the leading aeronautical engineering schools ISAE-Sup’Aéro and ENAC
 Fauga-Mauzac, south of Toulouse.
Three other centers:
 Lille, northern France (formerly the Lille Fluid Mechanics Institute)
 Salon-de-Provence, southern France, on the site of the Ecole de l’air flying school
 Modane-Avrieux, in the Savoy region of southeast France.

ONERA is organized in four scientific branches: Fluid Mechanics and Energetics; Materials and Structures; Physics; and Information Processing and Systems. Wind tunnel testing is managed in the GMT (Grands Moyens Techniques) department. Aerospace prospective depends on a specific department.

Missions 

Unlike NASA in the United States, ONERA is not an agency for space science and exploration. However, it carries out a wide range of research for space agencies, both CNES in France and the European Space Agency (ESA), as well as for the French defense agency, DGA (Direction générale de l’armement). ONERA also independently conducts its own long-term research to anticipate future technology needs. It focuses on scientific research, for example in aerodynamics for concrete applications on aircraft, the design of launchers and new defense technologies, such as drones or unmanned aerial systems (UAS).

ONERA also uses its research and innovation capabilities to support both French and European industry. ONERA has contributed to a number of landmark aerospace and defense programs in recent decades, including Airbus, Ariane, Rafale, Falcon, Mirage and Concorde.

Commercial partnerships 

ONERA's customer-partners include Airbus (Airbus Helicopters), Safran (Snecma, Turbomeca, Sagem), Dassault Aviation, Thales and other major industry players. Innovative small businesses are also encouraged to call on the expertise of ONERA's scientists and engineers, and to take advantage of technology transfer opportunities. The company Tefal was created by two ONERA engineers, the inventors of the “non-stick pan”. These products were produced and sold by Tefal S.A., which was subsequently acquired by SEB

Sites of ONERA facilities 
 ONERA Meudon – Châtillon – Palaiseau
 ONERA Lille
 ONERA Salon de Provence
 ONERA Fauga–Mauzac (wind tunnels)
 ONERA Toulouse
 ONERA Modane (wind tunnels)

Notes and references

See also 
 French space program
 CNES
 Aerospace Valley

External links
 

Aviation organizations based in France
Research institutes in France
Space program of France
Aerospace engineering organizations
Computer science institutes in France
Scientific agencies of the government of France
French companies established in 1946